Good Morning is an Australian indie rock duo from Melbourne, Australia.

History
The group began in 2014 with the release of their debut album, Shawcross. In January 2016, the duo released their second EP titled Glory.<ref name="cerealandsounds">{{cite web |last1=Chin |first1=Jonathan |title=Good Morning Glory' |url=https://www.cerealandsounds.com/2016/01/27/good-morning-glory/ |publisher=Cereal and Sounds |access-date=15 October 2021}}</ref>

Good Morning released their debut studio album in March 2018.

In 2019, Good Morning released two EPs, The Option and Basketball Breakups.

In 2021, the duo announced they had signed with Illinois-based record label Polyvinyl Records along with their second full-length album titled Barnyard''. The album was released on 22 October 2021. In addition to signing with Polyvinyl, the duo also signed a publishing deal with Sub Pop.

Discography

Albums

Extended plays/ EP

References

Polyvinyl Record Co. artists
Musical groups from Melbourne
spotify